Cool Water may refer to:

Music
 "Cool Water" (song), a song by Bob Nolan
 Cool Water (album), an album by Caravan
 "Cool Water", the album's title track
 "Cool, Cool Water", a song by the Beach Boys
 "Cool Water", a song by Talking Heads from the album Naked

Other
 Cool Water (perfume), a perfume brand

See also
 Carbonated water